George Grennell Jr. (December 25, 1786 – November 19, 1877) was a U.S. Congressman from Massachusetts.  He was born in Greenfield, Massachusetts on December 25, 1786, to parents George and Lydia (Stevens) Grennell. He attended Deerfield Academy and graduated from Dartmouth College in 1808.  He was admitted to the bar in 1811 and served as prosecuting attorney for Franklin County 1820–1828.

Grennell was a member of the Massachusetts State Senate 1825–1827.  Grennell was elected as an Anti-Jacksonian to the Twenty-first through the Twenty-six Congresses and reelected as a Whig to the Twenty-fifth Congress (March 4, 1829 – March 3, 1839).  He was not a candidate for renomination in 1838.

Grennell served as a trustee of Amherst College 1838–1859, a judge of probate 1849–1853, clerk of Franklin County Courts 1853–1865, and the first president of the Troy and Greenfield Railroad.

Grennell married twice: first to Helen Adelle Blake in 1814 and second to Eliza Seymour Perkins in 1820.
His son George Blake Grinnell became a noted businessman. Grennell died in Greenfield, Massachusetts November 19, 1877 and was interred in Greenfield's Green River Cemetery.

Notes

References

1786 births
1877 deaths
Dartmouth College alumni
Deerfield Academy alumni
Massachusetts National Republicans
People from Greenfield, Massachusetts
National Republican Party members of the United States House of Representatives
Whig Party members of the United States House of Representatives from Massachusetts
19th-century American politicians